is an association football video game developed and released by Alpha Denshi for arcades in 1983. The top-down overhead perspective was later popularized by Tehkan World Cup (1985) from Tehkan.

A sequel, Exciting Soccer II, was released in 1984. Japan replaced Austria. It has new music, but gameplay is identical.

Gameplay

Up to two players can play. They can tackle, shoot, short pass, and long pass, and take corner kicks, throw-ins, and penalty shoot-outs. The game also includes cheerleaders, digitized voices and an influential overhead view. Six teams are available for selection: Italy, England, Brazil, West Germany, Austria, or France. In single-player mode, if the player wins, they start a new match with a harder opponent.

Reception
In Japan, Game Machine listed Exciting Soccer on their November 1, 1983 issue as being the fourth most-successful new table arcade unit of the month.

Notes

References

External links
Screenshots at archive.org

1983 video games
Arcade video games
Arcade-only video games
Association football video games
Video games developed in Japan